Dame Zarine Kharas DBE (born June 1951) is the co-founder, with Anne-Marie Huby, of Justgiving, a global online giving platform.

Kharas was born in June 1951, in a Parsi family and grew up in Karachi, Pakistan, the daughter of a civil engineer father and a housewife mother.

She came to the UK to study law at Cambridge and remained. She worked for Lawrence Graham and Linklaters & Paines, both solicitor firms specialising in corporate and financial law. She then joined Credit Suisse First Boston (CSFB). When the head of CSFB, Hans-Joerg Rudloff, left to start his own investment banking operation, MC Securities, she followed him. Later she went back to her law firm roots, working with Simmons & Simmons. After which she and Huby started JustGiving.

Honours
In 2015, she was made a Dame Commander of the Order of the British Empire.

References

1951 births
Living people
Parsi people
Alumni of the University of Cambridge
Dames Commander of the Order of the British Empire
Date of birth missing (living people)
People from Karachi
British businesspeople
British people of Parsi descent
Pakistani Zoroastrians
Naturalised citizens of the United Kingdom
British businesspeople of Pakistani descent
British Zoroastrians
Pakistani emigrants to the United Kingdom